Sampheling Gewog (Dzongkha: བསམ་འཕེལ་གླིང་,Samphelling Gewog) is a gewog (village block) of Chukha District, Bhutan.

References

Gewogs of Bhutan
Chukha District